Akorede Ezekiel Taiwo (born 18 June 1997), also known by his stage name McKay, is a Nigerian rapper, songwriter and record producer.

Biography 
McKay was born in Lagos, Nigeria, where he grew up with his family and in 2013 he and his parents moved to Cape Town, South Africa. In 2015, McKay released an EP titled KINGS and KNIGHTS which has up to fifty thousand downloads.

In 2016, he released an album titled Genesis. In 2017, McKay released another EP titled Trappist 1 and also two songs titled “K” featuring King Genesis, and "LIL MOMMA PLEASE" featuring South African artist Tembisile. In 2018, McKay released another EP titled Trappist 2 which was ranked number 2 most streamed artist in South Africa by Spotify with more than 2 million streams on the app.

Discography

EPs 
 KINGS n KNIGHTS (2015)
 Genesis (2016)
 Trappist 1 (2017)
 Trappist 2 (2018)

Singles 
 “K” (featuring King Genesis) (2017)
 “LIL MOMMA PLEASE” (featuring Tembisile) (2017)
 “Better Days” (2020)
 “COCOON” (2020)

References

External links
YouTube channel

1997 births
Living people
Nigerian rappers